Michael McGoldrick is a Gaelic footballer who plays for the Derry county team. He plays his club football for Bellaghy Wolfe Tones.

Playing career

Inter-county
McGoldrick was part of the Derry Minor side that won the 2002 Ulster Minor Championship and All-Ireland Minor Championship.

He was first called up to the Derry Senior panel in November 2005 for the 2006 season, after impressive performances for Bellaghy en route to the Ulster Senior Club Championship final.

He established himself as a "first class corner-back" in Derry's run to the 2007 All-Ireland Championship quarter-final. A troublesome hamstring injury however, meant he played very little football in 2008.

McGoldrick is currently traveling around Australia and will definitely miss some of the 2009 season. The Irish News has reported he will stay for a year.

Championship games

Indicates substitute appearance.

References

1984 births
Living people
Bellaghy Gaelic footballers
Derry inter-county Gaelic footballers